Gerard Smets ( - after 1895) was a Belgian paleontologist, scientist, and abbé known for the misidentification of the plant genus Aachenosaurus (now known as Nicolia aegyptiaca), named after the locale of Aachen.

Biography
He was born around 1857, possibly in Gotem, Belgium, and he died after 1895.

History of the Aachenosaurus
Aachenosaurus was found by Smets in 1887; he named the species Aachenosaurus multidens, now known as Nicolia aegyptiaca, on October 31, 1888. Based on these fragments he determined that the specimen was a hadrosaur reaching an estimated 4-5 meters in length which might have had dermal spines. He defended this conclusion, citing that the fossils had been examined visually with the naked eye, magnifying lenses and with the microscope. However, his error was soon demonstrated by Louis Dollo. Smets at first tried to defend his original identification but was again proven wrong by a neutral commission. A rumor abounded that he completely withdrew from science out of pure embarrassment, but not until he had published a paper on turtles in 1889; this rumor was later proven false. The last paper he published was in 1895.

References

Belgian paleontologists
Abbés
19th-century Belgian scientists
1850s births